Arthur Clayton may refer to:

Sir Arthur Harold Clayton, 11th Baronet, of Marden (1903–1985) of the Clayton baronets
Arthur Clayton (actor) (1902–1955), British film actor

See also
Clayton (disambiguation)